Neyak may refer to:

Neyak, Mazandaran
Neyak, South Khorasan
Neyak, Tehran

See also
Nayak (disambiguation)